Coeloturatia is a monotypic moth genus of the family Noctuidae described by Strand in 1928. Its only species, Coeloturatia patanei, was first described by Turati in 1926. It is found in Libya.

References

Acontiinae
Monotypic moth genera